1832 Mrkos, provisional designation , is a carbonaceous asteroid from the outer region of the asteroid belt, approximately 30 kilometers in diameter. It was discovered on 11 August 1969 by Russian astronomer Lyudmila Chernykh at the Crimean Astrophysical Observatory in Nauchnyj, on the Crimean peninsula. It was named after Czech astronomer Antonín Mrkos.

Orbit and classification 

The C-type asteroid orbits the Sun in the outer main-belt at a distance of 2.9–3.5 AU once every 5 years and 9 months (2,104 days). Its orbit has an eccentricity of 0.10 and an inclination of 15° with respect to the ecliptic.

Physical characteristics

Rotation period 

In October 2004, a rotational lightcurve for Mrkos was obtained from photometric observations taken by American astronomer Brian Warner at his Palmer Divide Observatory in Colorado. It gave a rotation period of 13.64 hours with a brightness variation of 0.18 in magnitude.

Diameter and albedo 

According to the surveys carried out by the Infrared Astronomical Satellite IRAS, the Japanese Akari satellite, and NASA's Wide-field Infrared Survey Explorer with its subsequent NEOWISE mission, Mrkos measures between 27.18 and 30.78 kilometers in diameter, and its surface has an albedo between 0.068 and 0.097. The Collaborative Asteroid Lightcurve Link derives an albedo of 0.0567 and a diameter of 30.67 kilometers with an absolute magnitude of 11.3.

Naming 

This minor planet was named in honor of Czech astronomer Antonín Mrkos (1918–1996), a prolific discoverer of 273 minor planets and well known for his contributions to cometary astronomy. He was the director of the Kleť Observatory in what is now the Czech Republic, initiated the first minor planet survey in his country, was a professor at Charles University in Prague and University of South Bohemia, and a participant of a Soviet Antarctic expedition in the late 1950s. The official  was published by the Minor Planet Center on 1 June 1975.

References

External links 
 Lightcurve plot of 1832 Mrkos, Palmer Divide Observatory, B. D. Warner (2004)
 Asteroid Lightcurve Database (LCDB), query form (info )
 Dictionary of Minor Planet Names, Google books
 Asteroids and comets rotation curves, CdR – Observatoire de Genève, Raoul Behrend
 Discovery Circumstances: Numbered Minor Planets (1)-(5000) – Minor Planet Center
 
 

 

001832
Discoveries by Lyudmila Chernykh
Named minor planets
19690811